The acoustic ohm is a unit of measurement of acoustic impedance, which is the ratio of acoustic pressure to acoustic volume flow. In SI units, pressure is measured in pascals and flow in m3/s, so the acoustic ohm has units Pa·s/m3. In the cgs system, there is a cgs ohm with units dyne·s/cm5.

The acoustic ohm can be applied to fluid flow outside the domain of acoustics.  For such applications a hydraulic ohm with an identical definition may be used.  That is, the unit of the ratio of hydraulic pressure to hydraulic volume flow.  Acoustic impedance is to be considered an instance of hydraulic impedance.

See also
 Dyne

References
 Definition
 Second definition
 Third Definition

Units of measurement
Acoustics